Məşədi Həsən is a village and municipality in the Khizi Rayon of Azerbaijan. It has a population of 313.

References

Populated places in Khizi District